Joanna Harrington may refer to:

Joanna Harrington, fictional character in Night of the Demon
Joanna Harrington, widow of Laurence Saunders and Marian exile in Foxe's Book of Martyrs